The Boise Idaho Temple is the 29th constructed and 27th operating temple of the Church of Jesus Christ of Latter-day Saints. The temple is located in the city of Boise, Idaho.

History
Church leaders discussed building a temple in the western part of Idaho as early as 1939. However, with the majority of church's membership in the eastern part of Idaho, the leaders decided against it and concentrated on building the Idaho Falls Idaho Temple.

Forty-five years later, on March 31, 1982, church leaders announced that a temple would be built in the Boise area. The temple site is located near an exit from Interstate 84 and is very visible to those traveling along the highway and is also a visible landmark for pilots at Boise Airport.

In 1984, 70,000 visitors were expected to tour the temple during the nineteen-day open house. Instead, over 128,000 attended. The open house brought an increased interest in the church. The Boise Idaho Temple was dedicated May 25, 1984 by Gordon B. Hinckley.  After the dedication, attendance at the temple was much higher than expected. As a result, in October 1986, the temple was closed for renovation. After reopening in 1987, the temple was able to serve more than 100,000 members in southwestern Idaho and part of eastern Oregon.

It was built with a sloping roof & six-spire design.

In 2020, the Boise Idaho Temple was closed in response to the coronavirus pandemic.

Renovation
The temple closed on July 11, 2011, for extensive renovations and was rededicated on November 18, 2012, by Thomas S. Monson. Preceding the rededication an open house was held between October 13 and November 10, excluding Sundays. The renovation included work on the heating and cooling systems and a reconfiguration of the floor plan to make it more efficient. Most visibly, the marble tiles that covered the temple were removed and replaced with gray granite tiles.

See also

 Harold G. Hillam, a former temple president
 Comparison of temples of The Church of Jesus Christ of Latter-day Saints
 List of temples of The Church of Jesus Christ of Latter-day Saints
 List of temples of The Church of Jesus Christ of Latter-day Saints by geographic region
 Temple architecture (Latter-day Saints)
 The Church of Jesus Christ of Latter-day Saints in Idaho

References

External links
 
Boise Idaho Temple Official site
Boise Idaho Temple at ChurchofJesusChristTemples.org
  Boise Idaho Temple page with interior photos

20th-century Latter Day Saint temples
Buildings and structures in Boise, Idaho
Religious buildings and structures completed in 1984
Temples (LDS Church) in Idaho
Tourist attractions in Boise, Idaho
1984 establishments in Idaho